In Norse mythology, Nástrǫnd ("Corpse Shore") is a place in Hel where Níðhöggr lives and chews on corpses. It is the afterlife for those guilty of murder, adultery, and oath-breaking.

Orthography
In the standardized Old Norse orthography, the name was spelled Nástrǫnd, which in 11th century Old West Norse was pronounced . In Modern Icelandic the letter 'ǫ' is replaced by ö, and Náströnd is pronounced .

Poetic Edda
The Völuspá says:

Prose Edda
Snorri Sturluson quotes this part of Völuspá in the Gylfaginning section of his Prose Edda. He uses the plural of the word: Nástrandir (Corpse Shores).

{|
|
Á Náströndum er mikill salr ok illr, ok horfa í norðr dyrr, hann er ok ofinn allr ormahryggjum sem vandahús, en ormahöfuð öll vitu inn í húsit ok blása eitri, svá at eptir salnum renna eitrár, ok vaða þær ár eiðrofar ok morðvargar, svá sem hér segir:Sal veit ek standa
sólu fjarri
Náströndu á,
norðr horfa dyrr.
Falla eitrdropar
inn of ljóra.
Sá er undinn salr
orma hryggjum.
Skulu þar vaða
þunga strauma
menn meinsvara
ok morðvargar.

En í Hvergelmi er verst:

Þar kvelr Níðhöggr
nái framgengna. Gylfaginning 52, EB's edition
|
On Nástrand [Strand of the Dead] is a great hall and evil, and its doors face to the north: it is all woven of serpent-backs like a wattle-house; and all the snake-heads turn into the house and blow venom, so that along the hall run rivers of venom; and they who have broken oaths, and murderers, wade those rivers, even as it says here:

I know a hall standing
far from the sun,
In Nástrand:
the doors to northward are turned;
Venom-drops falls
down from the roof-holes;
That hall is bordered
with backs of serpents.
There are doomed to wade
the weltering streams
Men that are mansworn,
and they that murderers are.

But it is worst in Hvergelmir:

There the cursed snake tears
dead men's corpses. Gylfaginning 52, Brodeur's translation
|
|}

See also
Hel (being)
Hel (realm)
Niflheim
Niflhel

References

 Brodeur, Arthur Gilchrist (transl.) (1916). The Prose Edda by Snorri Sturluson. New York: The American-Scandinavian Foundation. Available online
 Dronke, Ursula (ed.) (1997) The Poetic Edda: Mythological Poems. Oxford: Oxford University Press. .
 Eysteinn Björnsson (ed.). Snorra-Edda: Formáli & Gylfaginning : Textar fjögurra meginhandrita''. 2005. Available online

Locations in Norse mythology
Norse underworld